Tachys oblitus is a species of ground beetle in the family Carabidae. It is found in North America.

References

Further reading

External links

 

Trechinae
Beetles described in 1918